The Vietnam national basketball team is the men's basketball team representing Vietnam in international competitions. The governing body of Vietnamese basketball operations is the Vietnam Basketball Federation.

Vietnam had its best finish at the 2019 Southeast Asian Games when it earned the bronze medal.

Team

Current Roster
This is the Team Vietnam roster for the 2025 FIBA Asia Cup Pre-qualifiers.

Depth chart

Past rosters
This was Team Vietnam for the 2025 FIBA Asia Cup Pre-qualifiers.

This was Team Vietnam for the 2021 SEA Games.

This was Team Vietnam for the 2021 VBA Season.

This was Team Vietnam for the 2019 SEA Games.

This was Team Vietnam for the 2017 SEA Games.

This was Team Vietnam for the 2017 SEABA Championship.

Competitive record

FIBA Asia Cup

SEABA Championship

Southeast Asian Games

Head coach position
 Anthony Garbelotto – 2014–2017
 Donte' Hill – 2017
 Todd Purves – 2018
 Kevin Yurkus – 2019–2022
 Matthew Van Pelt – 2022–Present

Kit
2017 - present: Hemero

Sponsor
2017: Vinaphone

See also
 Saigon Heat
 ASEAN Basketball League
 Sport in Vietnam
 Vietnam national under-19 basketball team
 Vietnam national under-17 basketball team
 Vietnam national 3x3 team
 Vietnam women's national basketball team

References

External links
  official site 
  from FIBA website

Videos
Basketball 🏀 Men's Vietnam 🇻🇳 vs 🇸🇬 Singapore | 29th SEA Games 2017 Youtube.com video

Men's national basketball teams
Basketball in Vietnam
 
Basketball
1952 establishments in Vietnam